Now That's What I Call Music – The Summer Album is a compilation album released on 6 July 1986 as a part of the (UK) Now! series. It takes the form as a special album in the series. It is notable for containing the songs "All You Need Is Love" and "Here Comes the Sun" by The Beatles. The Beatles and Apple Records don't often allow their songs to appear on various artists compilation albums. It was released on cassette and vinyl.

Track listing

Record/Tape 1 Side 1 (1)
 The Young Rascals - "Groovin'"
 The Isley Brothers - "Summer Breeze"
 The Beach Boys - "Do It Again"
 Bill Withers - "Lovely Day"
 10cc - "Dreadlock Holiday"
 Astrud Gilberto - "The Girl from Ipanema"
 Bobby Goldsboro - "Summer (The First Time)"

Record/Tape 1 Side 2 (2)
 Cliff Richard & The Shadows - "Summer Holiday"
 The Beach Boys - "California Girls"
 Eddie Cochran - "Summertime Blues"
 The Kinks - "Sunny Afternoon"
 The Drifters - "Under the Boardwalk"
 The Mamas & The Papas - "California Dreamin'"
 Scott McKenzie - "San Francisco (Be Sure to Wear Flowers in Your Hair)"
 The Beatles - "All You Need Is Love"

Record/Tape 2 Side 1 (3)
 Level 42 - "The Sun Goes Down (Living It Up)"
 Katrina and the Waves - "Walking on Sunshine"
 KC and the Sunshine Band - "Give It Up"
 Haircut One Hundred - "Fantastic Day"
 Elton John - "Island Girl"
 Martha & The Muffins - "Echo Beach"
 The Barracudas - "Summer Fun"

Record/Tape 2 Side 2 (4)
 The Beatles - "Here Comes the Sun"
 Cliff Richard - "The Day I Met Marie"
 Mungo Jerry - "In the Summertime"
 Small Faces - "Lazy Sunday"
 The Lovin' Spoonful - "Summer in the City"
 The Lovin' Spoonful - "Daydream"
 The Monkees - "Daydream Believer"
 Jerry Keller - "Here Comes Summer"

References
 Now That's What I Call Music - The Summer Album Track List and album cover

1986 compilation albums
Summer
EMI Records compilation albums
Virgin Records compilation albums
PolyGram compilation albums